Slavica Pretreger (born April 8, 1971) is a former Croatian female basketball player.

External links
Profile at eurobasket.com

1971 births
Living people
Sportspeople from Vukovar
Croatian women's basketball players
Shooting guards
ŽKK Gospić players
Mediterranean Games gold medalists for Croatia
Mediterranean Games medalists in basketball
Competitors at the 1997 Mediterranean Games
20th-century Croatian women